Vishwanath Mahadeshwar is a Shiv Sena Politician from Mumbai, Maharashtra. He has served as the Mayor of Brihanmumbai Municipal Corporation. He had also served as chairman of the civic education committee and was a member of the standing committee.

Positions held
 2002: Elected as corporator in Brihanmumbai Municipal Corporation
 2003: Elected as chairman of Education Committee in Brihanmumbai Municipal Corporation
 2007: Re-elected as corporator in Brihanmumbai Municipal Corporation 
 2012: Re-elected as corporator in Brihanmumbai Municipal Corporation 
 2017: Elected as Mayor of Brihanmumbai Municipal Corporation

References

External links
 Shivsena Home Page
 बृहन्मुंबई महानगरपालिका

Mayors of Mumbai
Marathi politicians
Maharashtra politicians
Shiv Sena politicians
21st-century Indian politicians
Living people
1960 births